The Nuvoletta clan was a powerful Neapolitan Camorra clan operating from the town of Marano di Napoli, situated on the northern outskirts of the city of Naples, southern Italy. The Nuvolettas belonged to a new style of Camorra, one that had the dimensions of a large corporation, and considered much more entrepreneurial. The clan was affiliated with several Sicilian Mafia families and was considered one of the most powerful Camorra clans between the 1970s and 1990s, however, since the death of its historical leaders and the large number of arrests and seizures made by the Italian police, the clan was succeeded by the Polverino and Orlando clans, both families with great degree of kinship with the Nuvoletta family.

Background
The Nuvoletta family was historically a very prominent family dedicated to numerous legal businesses and known to the media at least since the 1950s. In the 1960s, Ciro, Lorenzo and Angelo Nuvoletta initially joined the clan of Antonio Maisto who was dealing in contraband cigarettes. After their early exploits with the Maisto clan, they diversified and became significant landowners using state funds designed to set up small agricultural landholdings. They made their fortune swindling the Italian government and the European Economic Community (EEC) and intimidating insurance officials, as well as local farmers who took loans from finance companies managed by the Nuvolettas. During the 1980s the Nuvoletta clan transformed into an international holding investing in agriculture, cleaning contracts, construction, drugs, fraud, stud farming and hotels. The legal assets of the clan amounted to US$280 million around 1990.

The Nuvoletta clan first began to appear in the news at the same time the Nuova Famiglia (NF) was formed. The NF was a federation of Camorra clans which apart from the Nuovoletta clan, consisted of Michele Zaza (a Camorra boss with strong ties with Cosa Nostra), the Gionta clan (from Torre Annunziata), Antonio Bardellino from San Cipriano d'Aversa and Casal di Principe, the Alfieri clan led by Carmine Alfieri, the Galasso clan of Poggiomarino (led by Pasquale Galasso), the Fabbrocino clan of the Vesuvius area (led by Mario Fabbrocino), the Giuliano clan from Naples' quarter Forcella (led by Luigi Giuliano) and the Vollaro clan from Portici (led by Luigi Vollaro). It was formed to contrast the growing power of Raffaele Cutolo's Nuova Camorra Organizzata (NCO).

Links with Cosa Nostra
The clan's regent Lorenzo Nuvoletta was the heir to a family of landowners. His grandfather and then mother had accumulated large areas of land, with its fruit crops exported to other areas. The Nuvolettas had many significant and powerful contacts within the Sicilian Mafia, as a result of their relationship with the Sciorio family. Lorenzo's many telephone calls with Luciano Leggio, boss of the Corleonesi, were frequently intercepted by the Carabinieri. The Mafia "supergrasses", Tommaso Buscetta, Antonio Calderone and Salvatore Contorno, confirmed that the Nuvolettas had very close links with the Sicilian Mafia.

While testifying in court, the Sicilian Mafia boss Tommaso Buscetta, who became a pentito (collaborator with Italian Justice), spoke of Lorenzo Nuvoletta: 

Likewise, the Catania Mafia boss, Antonino Calderone, recalled: 

After his collaboration with Italian Justice in 1992, Galasso clan boss Pasquale Galasso revealed details of further meetings held at Nuvoletta's villas in 1981. He mentioned that these meetings frequently involved representatives of all the major Camorra clans, with usually a hundred people present, many of them fugitives, as well as dozens of cars. He explained:

Structure
The clan was ruled by the three Nuvoletta brothers: Lorenzo, Ciro, Angelo. Lorenzo died in 1994 after a serious illness; Ciro, the most bloodthirsty of the group was killed in 1984 in an armed attack on orders the Alfieri-Bardellino-Galasso. Angelo was the smartest of the brothers and literally the "brains" of the group, who was entrusted with the economic management of the group. Angelo was eventually arrested in May 2001, after having been on the list of 30 most dangerous fugitives in Italy since 1995. He was sentenced to life imprisonment for the murder of journalist, Giancarlo Siani.

Compared to the other Camorra clan in the 1980s and early 1990s, the Nuvoletta clan was almost unique in that they never had any high-level pentito. According to judge Giuseppe Borrelli, they were able to insulate themselves by adopting the cellular structure dominant within the Sicilian Mafia. As he explained:

Activities
The Nuvoletta clan is involved in mostly white collar rackets such as construction, supply of public entities, concrete manufacturing companies, cleaning companies and control of the operations of hotels. This is its economic empire as reconstructed by Anti-Mafia investigators, an empire with an annual turnover of 1,200 billion lire. A census taken of the part of their income from illegal activities in 1985, was estimated to be around 100,000 billion lire. In the early 1990s, this increased to 120,000 billion lire. Of these, 40,000 billion lire were proceeds from drug trafficking and 30,000 billion lire were from extortion.

Present day 
After being decimated by the arrests of most of its affiliates and the death of its historical leaders, groups that were formerly Nuvoletta's ramifications, such as the Orlando and the Polverino clans, became independent and powerful, inheriting much of what was once the Nuvoletta clan. In fact, the Polverino clan is considered their successor on the territory of Marano and surrounding areas.

References

Behan, Tom (1996). The Camorra, London: Routledge, 
Behan, Tom (2002). See Naples and Die: The Camorra and Organized Crime, London/New York, Taurus Publishers, 

 
1960s establishments in Italy
2000s disestablishments in Italy
Camorra clans